Ginna may refer to:

 Ginna Nuclear Generating Station, Ontario, New York, United States
 Arnaldo Ginna (1890-1982), Italian painter, sculptor and filmmaker
 Ginna Lopez (born 1994), member of the Peru women's national volleyball team
 Ginna Marston (born 1958), American advertising executive
 Ginna, competitor in the Danish reality television series Big Brother 6
 Ginna (film), a 2022 Indian romantic action comedy